VTV3 is a state-owned Vietnamese television channel owned by the Vietnam Television, launched officially on 31 March 1996. As the country's first ever sports and entertainment dedicated channel, it broadcasts sporting events and entertainment-oriented programs including music, game shows, leisure & lifestyles, nationally produced, as well as American and Asian series.

Broadcast history 
 VTV3 first broadcast for testing in June 1994 during the 1994 World Cup, it aired alongside VTV1 and VTV2 on channel 9 VHF in Hanoi from 16:00 to 19:00 as a general Sports – Entertainment – Cultural channel. 
 From April 1995, the channel broadcast on channel 6 in Hanoi with the content Sports - Culture – Entertainment – Economic Information. 
 At 10:00 a.m., 31 March 1996, on channel 6 in Hanoi and surrounding areas, VTV3 officially launched as a Sports – Entertainment – Economic Information channel. It is also relayed nationwide via satellite in July of the same year. Since the launch of the channel, VTV began to broadcast the Premier League, made this channel becomes the first ever channel to broadcast the tournament in Vietnam, starting from the 1996-97 season. 
 From 1 October 1997, VTV3 separated its frequency to channel 22 UHF in Hanoi, 21 UHF in Danang and channel 28 UHF in Ho Chi Minh City with nighttime programs. This also made VTV3 to become the second channel to air live the current affairs news program Thời sự alongside VTV1 at 19:00.
 The channel began to be relayed nationwide via satellite with an independent frequency on 31 March 1998.
 December 31, 1999: Together with VTV1, VTV2 and VTV4, it broadcast a special program to welcome the new century with a record of shortest length at that time in Vietnam to welcome the year 2000.
 Beginning from 31 December 2001, VTV3 increased the broadcasting times followed:
 From 31 December 2001 to 31 August 2006: 06:00 to 24:00
 From 1 September 2006 to 18 March 2020 and from 1 May 2020 to present: 24 hours per day
 Between 2013 – 2014, the manufacture department of VTV3 were splitted into two separated departments: the sports-producing crew were splitted into a separate department alongside the VTV1 sports room (Department for Sports Productions, Vietnamese: Ban Sản xuất các chương trình Thể thao or Ban Thể thao – Sports Department for short). The remaining VTV3 entertainment team was renamed Department for Entertainment Productions (Vietnamese: Ban Sản xuất các chương trình Giải trí)
 Since 2007, most sporting programs were moved to VTV2 (VTV6 in 2013). In 2020, Nhịp đập 360 độ thể thao (Sports 360° – The Beat) – the morning sports bulletin – was transferred to VTV6, leaving the VTV3 channel to broadcast entertainment-oriented programs, and transmitting sports programs during special occasions only. The bulletin was later relaunched in 2021 as Nhịp đập thể thao (Sports Beat), and beginning to broadcast on both VTV3 and VTV6 from 12 April 2021.
Between 19 March and 30 April 2020, as a safety precaution due to the COVID-19 pandemic in Vietnam, Vietnam Television temporarily suspended the overnight timeslot on VTV3, along with most VTV channels, and limited the broadcast time to 19 hours per day.
 From February 14, 2022, until now, most sports programs have officially returned to VTV3 in the morning and afternoon time frames, thereby bringing sports content back on VTV3 after about 7 years of stopping  broadcasting.
 From October 10, 2022, the bulletin Nhịp đập thể thao (Sports Beat) is only broadcast at 6:00 a.m. daily and the sports bulletin is updated at 5:00 p.m. daily on VTV3.

VTV3 HD 
VTV3 became the first national commercial television channel in Vietnam to have a HD simulcast. VTV3 HD was soft-launched from 31 March 2013 to mark VTV3's 17th anniversary and was officially launched on 1 June 2013. Most programs broadcasting by VTV3 since 2013 are in HDTV with a 16:9 picture format.

On November 1, 2022, VTV3 officially merged SD and HD streams into a single channel stream.

Program 

Since the first broadcast, VTV3 has paved the way for entertainment programs, licensed feature films, sports programs, etc. to be broadcast on this channel. However, due to the lack of programs in the early period, "exploiting programs" from Southern region were exploited by VTV3's editorial team and purchased the transmission rights.

Since the broadcast times increase to 18 hours per day, VTV3 has started to upgrade program contents, change some timeslots, especially airing series of new gameshows (especially Saturday morning, from mid-2004). From 2005, entertainment programs were transmitted in the 20:00 timeslot from Monday til Friday; gameshows were followed an hour later since 2006. The foreign TV series slots at 18:00 every day since the end of 2005 began to appear denserly Asian dramas. Some weekend night live music programs are expanded, especially with the appearance of Bài hát Việt (Vietnamese Songs).

Not only gameshow and reality television, VTV3 also produces, cooperates and implements many great and unique programs of great significance. In addition, the VTV3 department also works and reports at major tournaments (made by the Sports Department), produces the Miss Vietnam contest with Tien Phong Newspaper and young aspiration art program with Thanh Niên Newspaper after National Congress of Ho Chi Minh Communist Youth Union, as well as special socio-political programs, with special contents in collaboration with domestic media agencies...

Since 2008, VTV3 began to change its appearance, focusing on improving the quality of the program, especially with the appearance of many novel game shows, increasing the slots of feature-length films, opened the prime time slot for Vietnamese feature series at 21:00 (currently 21:30). While HTV, went on downward due to licensing and inspection problems, several TV production companies tend to switch to cooperate with VTV, so on VTV3 there have appeared many new reality TV programs that attract millions of viewers with strong investment and preparation such as Universal Dance, Vietnam Idol, Perfect Couple, Vietnamese Model, etc., which created a new breeze for the channel, although these programs appear not less scandalous.

In 2012, VTV3 continued to improve the contents and changed the time slots. From this time forward, the contents on VTV3 become more and more diversal, with infotainment programs Cà phê sáng với VTV3 (Morning Coffee with VTV3), Cà phê sáng cuối tuần (Weekend Morning Coffee); revival editions of programs such as talkshow Khách của VTV3 (VTV3's Guests), university-oriented game show SV (SV 2012), comedy-oriented Weekend Gathering/Gặp nhau cuối tuần (Weekend Relaxation/Thư giãn cuối tuần) as well as reality TV series broadcast on weekends.

Since 2018, while new game, reality shows and scripted programs co-produced by domestic agencies are dominated in primetime slot, the solely produced programs by VTV3 team were moved to daytime and have some signs of setback sufferings.

For sports programs, from the very beginning, VTV3 is the first VTV channel to broadcasting sporting events, such as Premier League, UEFA Champions League, UEFA Europa League, UEFA Super Cup, FIFA World Cup, the Olympic Games, the Asiad, SEA Games, especially the 2003 Southeast Asian Games with Vietnam as the host nation. Besides, VTV3 also airing sports news bulletins and magazines during daytime and afternoon drivetime. From 2005, VTV3 transmitted the 360° thể thao (Sports 360°) bulletin with timeslots falls on drivetime and late-night. From 2011, the late-night edition, known as Nhịp đập 360° thể thao (Sports 360° – The Beat; airing since 2007) has been moved to morning timeslot. Since 2015, most of VTV3 sports programs were moved to youth-oriented channel VTV6, including the main bullettin 360° thể thao, followed by the morning bulletin 5 years later.

Since 2022, following the relaunch of Nhịp đập 360° thể thao as Nhịp đập thể thao (Sports Beat) and the premiere of Ký ức thể thao (Sports Memories) in the previous year, several sports magazines were returned to VTV3 at daytime, which somehow reviving sporting contents on the channel after 7-year hiatus.

Since 10 October 2022, after the closing of VTV6, most sports events were reported live again on VTV3 (along with VTV2), thereby bringing sports events (besides VTV5) back after 8-year hiatus.

Featured programs

Present
News everyday: Nhịp đập thể thao (06:00), Morning Café (06:30), News (19:00).
Dramas: Vietnamese prime time dramas (21:40), Foreign dramas (Mon-Fri), Sitcom, etc.

Weekday
Monday: Hành lý tình yêu - The Baggage
Tuesday: Ai là triệu phú – Who Wants to be a Millionaire
Wednesday: Sàn chiến giọng hát - Singer Auction 
Thursday: Đối đầu đỉnh cao
Friday: Vua tiếng Việt

Weekend
Saturday: 
Vui khỏe có ích
Hành trình hạnh phúc
Quân khu số 1
Chuyện chàng - chuyện nàng
Cơ hội cho ai - Whose Chance
Trạng nguyên nhí 
Cầu thủ nhí
Thần tượng đối thần tượng 
Gương mặt thân quen - Your Face Sounds Familiar
Người phụ nữ hạnh phúc 
Sunday 
Sức nước ngàn năm
Tỷ lệ may mắn
100 triệu 1 phút – Million Dollar Minute
Con nhà người ta
Đường lên đỉnh Olympia 
Vượt thành chiến - Block Out
Bài hát hay nhất - Sing My Song
Lời tự sự

Before
 Hãy yêu nhau đi
 Lạ lắm à nha – The Wall Song  
 Tường lửa – The Wall
 Chọn đâu cho đúng – Crush  
 5 vòng vàng kỳ ảo – 5 Gold Rings
 Giọng hát Việt – The Voice
 Trò chơi âm nhạc - The Lyrics Board / Don't Forget The Lyrics!
 Ban nhạc Việt – The Band
 6 ô cửa bí ẩn – 9 Windows   
 Không thỏa hiệp – Divided
 Hãy chọn giá đúng – The Price is Right
 Chiếc nón kỳ diệu - Wheel of Fortune
 Đấu trường 100 – 1 vs 100
 Gương mặt thân quen – Your Face Sounds Familiar
 Hành khách cuối cùng - El Último Pasajero (The Last Passenger)
 Vượt thành chiến – Block Out
 Bài hát hay nhất – Sing My Song 
 Đố ai hát được – Sing If You Can
 Vì bạn xứng đáng - You Deserve It
 Đừng để tiền rơi - The Million Pound Drop
 Nhóm nhảy siêu Việt - Vietnam's Best Dance Crew
 Đêm tiệc cùng sao – Hollywood Game Night   
 Chọn ngay đi – The Best of All
While there were more shows airing, some of them were national TV programs that have got no equivalent international formatting, thus should not be listed here for dialectical reason.

See also
List of television programmes broadcast by Vietnam Television (VTV)
HTV7

Notes

References

Vietnam Television
Television channels and stations established in 1996
Sports television networks
Television networks in Vietnam